San Francisco Chindúa is a town and municipality in Oaxaca in south-western Mexico. The municipality covers an area of 28.07 km².  
It is part of the Nochixtlán District in the southeast of the Mixteca Region.

As of 2005, the municipality had a total population of 673.

References

Municipalities of Oaxaca